National Assembly of Rwanda (French: Assemblée nationale) was the unicameral legislature of Rwanda from 1961 to 1973. It was established in January 1961, and members were elected in general elections. It was dissolved following the coup d'état of 1973.

Speakers

Elections
1961 Rwandan parliamentary election
1965 Rwandan general election
1969 Rwandan general election

See also
Politics of Rwanda
History of Rwanda

Sources

Parliament of Rwanda
Government of Rwanda
Rwanda
Rwanda
1961 establishments in Rwanda
1973 disestablishments in Rwanda